81 class  may refer to:

British Rail Class 81
DRG Class 81
KTM Class 81
New South Wales 81 class locomotive